Bill Bell (1927 – 28 November 2016) was a Canadian basketball player. He competed in the men's tournament at the 1948 Summer Olympics.

References

1927 births
2016 deaths
Canadian men's basketball players
Olympic basketball players of Canada
Basketball players at the 1948 Summer Olympics
Basketball people from British Columbia
People from Revelstoke, British Columbia
UBC Thunderbirds basketball players